This is a list of the number-one hits of 2009 on FIMI's Italian Singles and Albums Charts.

Note: Charts started being published on Mondays as of the issue dated 6 July 2009.

See also
2009 in music
List of number-one hits in Italy

External links
FIMI archives
ItalianCharts.com

Number-one hits
Italy
2009